The Horne Prize is an Australian award established by Aēsop and The Saturday Paper in 2016 for a literary essay of up to 3000 words on Australian life. The prize is valued at $15,000 (Australian) and named in honour of Donald Horne (1921–2005) in recognition of his contribution to literature and journalism in Australia. The inaugural winner was Anna Spargo-Ryan for The Suicide Gene.

In 2018 a guideline was introduced concerning the need for people from minority groups to tell their own stories. On learning of this restriction two judges, Anna Funder and David Marr resigned from the panel. The restriction was subsequently removed and the closing date for entries extended by one month. The winner was selected by the remaining three judges, Erik Jensen, Suzanne Santos and Marcia Langton.

Award winners

Shortlists 
Winners in bold.

2016

 Chelsea Bond, Mythologies of Aboriginal Culture
 Barry Jones, The Courage Party
 Anna McGahan, Brightness
 Alexandra O’Sullivan, Losing Teeth
 Anna Spargo-Ryan, The Suicide Gene

2017

 Alice Bishop, Coppering
 Kerryn Goldsworthy, The Limit of the World
 Lucas Grainger-Brown, Without Heroes
 Jennifer Mills, Swimming with Aliens
 Sam Watson, Blood on the Boundary

2018

Melanie Cheng, All the Other Stories
 Claire G. Coleman, After the Grog War
 Joy Goodsell, Domestic Terrorism
 Daniel James, Ten More Days
 Fiona Wright, State Your Intentions

2019

 Claire G. Coleman, Hidden in Plain Sight
 Mick Daley, Up Expletive Hill
 Carly Findlay, In Sickness and In Health
 Rachael Lebeter, Diary of a Wildlife Carer
 Thomas Mayor, A Dream That Cannot Be Denied

2020
 Kgshak Akec, When Deep Roots Unearth
 Steven Amsterdam, There and Here
 Rachel Ang, Magnetic Fields
 Lauren Carroll Harris, Subject Line: The Storyteller
 Melanie Cheng, The Silent Pandemic
 Jessica Friedmann, Water, Everywhere
 Leah Jing McIntosh, An Australian Body
 Atul Joshi, Marsden Park

References

External links 

 Official website

Awards established in 2016
2016 establishments in Australia
Australian literature-related lists